Kapamilya Channel (stylized as Kapamilya channel) is a 24-hour Philippine pay television network owned and operated by ABS-CBN Corporation, a company under Lopez Holdings Corporation owned by the López family. The network is headquartered at the ABS-CBN Broadcasting Center in Quezon City where it started broadcasting on June 13, 2020, also marking its parent company's 74th anniversary. A separate high definition 1080i resolution channel began broadcasting the same day. 

The network serves as the replacement of the main terrestrial ABS-CBN network after ceasing its free-to-air broadcast operations after the loss of its legislative franchise in 2020. It carries most of programs that ABS-CBN aired prior to the shutdown.

Overview
The channel is available through most cable providers who are members of the Philippine Cable and Telecommunications Association (PCTA) (including ABS-CBN's Sky Cable) and through direct broadcast satellite television service providers Sky Direct (until June 30, 2020), G Sat, and since October 21, 2020, through Cignal and SatLite. This allowed ABS-CBN to continue producing and distributing content while the outcome of their congressional franchise application was still pending at that time since the NTC's cease and desist order for the network only covers the company's free-to-air television and radio stations. The network's franchise renewal was rejected by the House of Representatives on July 10, 2020, after a 70-11 vote. The network also streams live and makes most of its shows available on the streaming service iWant (now iWantTFC). On August 1, 2020, the network officially launched the Kapamilya Online Live, which livestreams some of contents from Kapamilya Channel and Jeepney TV on the online video-sharing platforms Facebook and YouTube. Although the network itself is available only in the Philippines, most of its local programs are available on ABS-CBN's international subscription service The Filipino Channel via cable, satellite, online and IPTV.

Unlike the main terrestrial ABS-CBN that signs off during the overnight hours, Kapamilya Channel operates 24/7 with Movie Central Presents shown during the overnight slots except during the overnight hours of the Paschal Triduum courtesy of the Holy Week in the Philippines wherein it signs off at Good Friday and Black Saturday from midnight to 6:00 a.m.

The channel, along with TeleRadyo, broadcasts the daily Three O'Clock Prayer similar to the main terrestrial ABS-CBN.

Programming

Kapamilya Channel features shows that have aired or were slated to air on ABS-CBN whose productions were suspended due to the Luzon enhanced community quarantine in March 2020 as well as the ensuing uncertainty following the NTC's cease and desist order. These include the variety shows It's Showtime (with new segments) and ASAP Natin 'To; the second season of singing competition The Voice Teens; teleseryes Ang Probinsyano, Love Thy Woman, and A Soldier's Heart; and morning talk show Magandang Buhay. Two new public service programs, Paano Kita Mapasasalamatan? hosted by Judy Ann Santos, and Iba 'Yan hosted by Angel Locsin, made their debut on Kapamilya Channel.

Contrary to earlier news reports, ABS-CBN's primary news program, TV Patrol, as well as several news and current affairs programs, was not initially aired on the Kapamilya Channel (as it did through the free-to-air channel) until after July 24, 2020; the program did air exclusively on TeleRadyo, ANC, and Cine Mo! and streamed through the ABS-CBN News' Facebook page and YouTube channel until the said date. The delayed telecast of ANC's The World Tonight also began to air at 10:00 p.m. on the following Monday, July 27, 2020, making the two longest-running Filipino and English language evening newscasts in the country airing on the same channel once again since 1999. The morning simulcast of TeleRadyo's programming (which was also aired on ABS-CBN as a provisionary morning program prior to the shutdown) on the schedule remained the same. An evening 30-minute News Patrol program was aired on the Kapamilya Channel until July 24, 2020.

Like the main terrestrial ABS-CBN network, Kapamilya Channel also broadcasts several Asian dramas, including 2gether: The Series, the first Thai boy's love series to be acquired by ABS-CBN through a partnership of Dreamscape Entertainment and GMMTV, and Still 2gether, the sequel of the said show. Other series include the Thai dramas Come To Me and I'm Tee, Me Too. 

On September 12, 2020, the network launched Just Love Kids, a children's programming block focusing on educational programs and animated series that have previously aired on ABS-CBN, Knowledge Channel, and the now-defunct Yey! channel. The children's show Team Yey! premiered its new fifth season for the first time on Kapamilya Channel.

On August 17, 2020, the series Ang sa Iyo ay Akin was the first original digital teleserye to be broadcast on Kapamilya Channel and Kapamilya Online Live during the COVID-19 pandemic. Some of the scenes were shot in the ABS-CBN Soundstage inside the Horizon IT Park in Bulacan.

On October 10, 2020, selected programs from Kapamilya Channel are also aired on A2Z Channel 11, a free-to-air television channel joint venture between ABS-CBN and ZOE Broadcasting Network through a blocktime agreement.

On October 21, 2020, Kapamilya Channel became available on Cignal owned by MediaQuest Holdings, the owner of ABS-CBN's rival TV5, to expand more viewers of the said channel. From January 24, 2021, selected Kapamilya Channel programming have also started simulcasting on TV5 as part of an agreement between the network, Cignal TV and ABS-CBN.

On March 18, 2021, ABS-CBN and WeTV iflix announced a partnership to bring primetime programs, including FPJ's Ang Probinsyano to the two streaming platforms starting March 20, with early access for subscribed users. Episodes of ABS-CBN shows are made available on WeTV and iflix VIP two days before it airs on local TV.

Online streaming on their channel's official website (until November 13, 2020) and Kapamilya Online Live (with the exception of iWantTFC) does not include contents such as acquired programming, movie blocks and overnight programming, as the live streaming itself only airs original programming due to copyright restrictions.

Facebook and YouTube

Kapamilya Online Live is a web-based channel owned and operated by ABS-CBN Corporation that launched on August 1, 2020, and livestreams on Facebook and YouTube. On Facebook, the shows are streamed on regular timeslots with some scheduled commentary breaks between timeblocks. On YouTube, it streams throughout the day from 6:00 a.m. to midnight (except during TV special events). Livestreaming of shows on both platforms are available exclusively in the Philippines and it airs a variety of ABS-CBN's old shows from Jeepney TV and other exclusive online shows.

On August 1, 2021, Kapamilya Online Live became accessible worldwide and streams 24-hours with classic series (weekdays), Star Cinema movies and specials (weekends) aired throughout the midnight programming.

Streams

On February 22, 2021, Kapamilya Online Live started to offer a video on demand service of its shows accessible for seven days after their original streaming date.

References

External links

ABS-CBN
ABS-CBN Corporation channels
Assets owned by ABS-CBN Corporation
Filipino-language television stations
Television networks in the Philippines
Television channels and stations established in 2020
2020 establishments in the Philippines
High-definition television